The 1964 Kansas State Wildcats football team represented Kansas State University in the 1964 NCAA University Division football season.  The team's head football coach was Doug Weaver.  The Wildcats played their home games in Memorial Stadium for the second to last year.  The Wildcats finished the season with a 3–7 record with a 3–4 record in conference play.  They finished in a tie for seventh place.  The Wildcats scored 64 points and gave up 186 points.

Schedule

References

Kansas State
Kansas State Wildcats football seasons
Kansas State Wildcats football